Ijaharul Hussain is an Indian politician from Bihar and a Member of the Bihar Legislative Assembly. Hussain won the Kishanganj Assembly constituency on INC ticket in the 2020 Bihar Legislative Assembly election.

References

Living people
Bihar MLAs 2020–2025
Indian National Congress politicians from Bihar
Year of birth missing (living people)